Vitex trifolia, the simpleleaf chastetree, is a large coastal shrub or small tree.

Description
Vitex trifolia is a large coastal shrub or small tree, less than 5 m in height with the stems covered by soft hairs (tomentose). The leaves are oppositely arranged along the stems and are usually compound, composed of three linear leaflets which range between 1 and 12 cm in length. The upper surfaces of the leaves are green and the lower surfaces are grayish green.

The flowers are born in panicles or clusters up to 18 cm in length. Individual flowers have purple to violet, two-lipped corollas that are about 5 mm long. The stamens are in two pairs and the ovary is superior, or develops above the corolla. The fleshy fruits are about 6 mm in diameter and contain four small, black seeds.

Distribution
Vitex trifolia is naturally found along coastlines from tropical East Africa as far east as French Polynesia.

Traditional medicine
The leaves are used to treat female ailments in the Cook Islands, and used to relieve fever in Samoa. Additionally in Samoa, the dried leaves are burned to deter mosquitos.

References

Details on Vitex trifolia

trifolia
Flora of Africa
Medicinal plants
Plants described in 1753
Taxa named by Carl Linnaeus

ml:വെള്ളനൊച്ചി